Johan van Veen (Uithuizermeeden, 21 December 1893 – The Hague, 9 December 1959) was a Dutch hydraulic engineer. He is considered the father of the Delta Works.

Education 
Johan van Veen was the fifth child of seven in a farming family. He was the brother of Marie van Veen, married to the artist Johan Dijkstra. In 1913, after high school graduation, he started his studies in Delft at the Technische Hoogeschool van Delft. He studied civil engineering. In 1919, he graduated as "ingenieur" (equivalent to M.Sc. in engineering).

Provincial Water Authority Drenthe
Van Veen worked as an engineer for the Drainage Department of the Provincial Water Authority of the Province of Drenthe. The task of this department was to develop plans to improve the drainage and road structure of the province. In turn, this would enlarge the agricultural yield and to transport the products in a more efficient way to the markets (in the western part of the Netherlands).

During World War I, it became evident that the Netherlands depended too strongly on food products from abroad. The interwar years were focused on agriculture. In order to have solid grounds for such plans, the borders of watersheds were charted, discharge measurements were made and leveling out valleys and the adjacent higher grounds works were executed. Van Veen carried out these studies in cooperation with agricultural engineer F.P. Mesu (who graduated in Wageningen).

Surinam
In 1926, van Veen left the Provincial Water Authority. From August 1926 to October 1928, he worked in Surinam at the Surinaamse Bauxiet Maatschappij (Suriname Bauxite Company), later a subsidiary of Alcoa, in Moengo, Suriname.

Rijkswaterstaat
In 1929, after his return to the Netherlands, van Veen held a position at Rijkswaterstaat (the Executive Agency of the Dutch Ministry of Infrastructure). He became head of the newly created Research Department for Tidal Rivers and Estuaries. His first assignment was to improve the hydraulic conditions at Hellegat, a complicated bifurcation of estuary branches. He also developed a new method to calculate tides, an improvement on the formulas developed by Hendrik Lorentz on the closure of the Zuiderzee.
He published his Ph.D. thesis on sand movement in the Strait of Dover (which was relevant for Dutch coastal morphology), based on extensive measurements in that area. He wrote many (Dutch) reports on the coasts, tidal movements, estuaries and salt intrusion.

In the years before and during World War II, van Veen executed many studies on the problem of salt intrusion into tidal rivers. During the war, he prepared a plan called "Verlandingsplan" to manipulate tidal rivers in such a way that natural silting-up would take place, and that to reclaim this new land would be easy. Just after the war, he presented this plan again, but mainly because at that time the country focused rather not on reclaiming land, but on repairing war damage.

Delta Plan
From 1937 onward, van Veen warned about the deplorable condition of the Dutch flood defences. He stipulated that a disaster was imminent, but politically he found no support for his warnings, the main reason being that improvement of dikes would cost a lot of money, which was not available in the Netherlands just after the war (the country depended mainly on money from the Marshall Plan). He had already published a book in English on the history of Dutch Hydraulic Engineering (Dredge, Drain, Reclaim, the Art of a Nation). In later reprints of this book he added a chapter by "Dr. Cassandra" as he used this pseudonym, including these warnings. His final warning report was a study describing the risks, including a plan to improve the situation by closing some estuaries. This document was dated January 29, 1953. 
During the following night The Netherlands were struck by the biggest storm surge ever, the North Sea flood of February 1st, 1953. After the disaster a State Commission was installed (18 February 1953), and Johan van Veen was appointed Secretary of the State Commission. In May 1953 the commission offered its first interim report, recommending immediate closure of the Hollandse IJssel with a storm surge barrier Flood barrier, and to implement Van Veen's plan to close the estuaries (the Delta Works). Eventually this work had been carried out; the final report of the commission was published in 1960, one year after Johan van Veen died. In The Netherlands Johan van Veen is remembered as the "father of the Delta Plan" and in England as "Master of the Floods".

Inventions
Johan van Veen has a number of inventions to his name. Notable is the Van Veen Grab Sampler, a device to take (disturbed) bed samples from the seabed (around 1930).  He is also the inventor of the pneumatic barrier to prevent salt intrusion (around 1940). In 1930, he proved the analogy between electricity and water flow. From this principle he developed an analog computer to calculate tidal flow (electric analogon). In the period 1944-1956 it had become operational. Later on this machine was updated and became the practical computer to calculate tidal flow and water levels in the Dutch Delta to predict the effect of closure works, the Delta Works. This analog computer now bears the name Deltar.

Personal life and death
On May 5, 1927, van Veen married Hendrika ("Henny") Aalfs during his stay in Suriname. They had three children. Unfortunately, their marriage was not very happy.
Although he came from a Dutch Reformed Church family, he converted to Christian Science until 1937, following his sister Anna, who lived in the United States.

Van Veen suffered from a number of heart attacks, the first one in 1937 and later in 1948 a heavy one after his "four-island-plan" was rejected. In 1959 he had his last, fatal attack in the train when on his way to a meeting regarding his plan of a new harbour near Delfzijl, the Eemshaven.

Publications (in English)
 Sand waves in the North Sea Hydrographic review, Vol. XII, No. 1 (May 1935)
 Measurements in the Straits of Dover, and their relation to the Netherlands coasts (1935) PhD thesis Utrecht University
 Water movements in the Straits of Dover J. of Marine Research Vol. 13, no. 1 (1938) ; p. 7-36
 The analogy between tides and electrical currents Rijkswaterstaat BER037, 
 Analogy between Tides and A.C. Electricity The Engineer, dec 1947 (pp 498, 520. 544)
 Research of Tidal Rivers in the Netherlands: a successful combination of theory and practice Dock & Harbour Authority, Vol. 27, Nos. 313 and 314, November and December 1946
 Estimates of tidal currents in The Panama Canal Zone (1947, unclear origin)
 The calculation of tides in new channels Transactions American Geophysical Union, 1947, Volume 28, Issue 6
 Dredge, Drain Reclaim (5th edition, 1960) Martinus Nijhof
 Ebb and flood channel systems in the Dutch tidal waters Bilingual version of a paper published in 1950 in the Journal of the Dutch Geographic VII. 67, 1950, 303-325
 Tidal Gullies in youngest peat layer of Groningen Proc. Int. Congress Sedimentology, Netherlands (1951) pp. 257–266
 Coasts, estuaries and tidal hydraulics Chapter from the "Civil Engineering Reference Book", edited by E.H. Probst and J. Comrie 1951 (pp1071–1106)
 English and Dutch methods of shore protection (correspondence on a article with R.R. Minikin) The Dock and Harour Authority, May–June 1952
 discussion on: "Application to an hydraulic problem" (by Glover, Herbert & Daum) transactions ASCE,1953 vol 118, pp1010–1028  
 Land below sea level : Holland in its age-long fight against the waters 1953 Boucher, The Hague
 Tide-gauges, subsidence-gauges and floodstones in the Netherlands Geologie en Mijnbouw, 1954 (16) pp 214–219 (Symposium quaternary changes in level, especially in the Netherlands)
 Development of marine plains, penetration of sea water in Dutch tidal rivers and inland waters 1957 Pub. 38 IAHR conf Rome (111)
 Necessity of subsidence-gauges Publ. Dutch Geodetic Society for the UGGI congress 1957 
 The Rotterdam waterway considered as a rivermouth "De Ingienieur, 1958, nr 28

For a full list of all his publications (mainly in Dutch) is referred to the Tresor of Dutch Hydraulic Engingeering.

Notes

References

External links
Stichting Blauwe Lijn: Johan van Veen Extensive repository of publications by van Veen 

1893 births
1959 deaths
Dutch civil engineers
Dutch civil servants
Delft University of Technology alumni
Members of the Royal Netherlands Academy of Arts and Sciences
Delta Works